Alexander John Jones (born 10 November 1988) is a Welsh cricketer. Jones is a right-handed batsman who bowls left-arm medium pace. He was born at Bridgend, Glamorgan and educated at Cowbridge Comprehensive School.

Jones first appeared in county cricket for Wales Minor Counties against Oxfordshire in the 2007 Minor Counties Championship, while the following season he played his first match in the MCCA Knockout Trophy against Dorset. In 2009 while studying for his degree in Sport and Physical Education at Cardiff Metropolitan University, Jones played for Cardiff UCCE against county sides, though the matches were not rated as first-class.

Having been a part of Glamorgan's Academy since 2005, he eventually made his first team debut for the county in a List A match against Somerset in the 2010 Clydesdale Bank 40. The following season he made further List A appearances, as well as making his first-class debut against Surrey in the County Championship. It was not in List A or first-class cricket that he had success in during the 2011 season, but in Twenty20 cricket instead. Making his debut in that format against Middlesex, he went on to take 15 wickets in the 2011 Friends Provident t20, which came at 17.06 apiece with best figures of 3/16.

Jones was released by Glamorgan after the expiry of his contract at the end of the 2013 season, after making only one county championship appearance in two years.

Career Best Performances
as of 29 September 2013

References

External links
Alex Jones at ESPNcricinfo
Alex Jones at CricketArchive

1988 births
Living people
Sportspeople from Bridgend
Alumni of Cardiff Metropolitan University
Welsh cricketers
Wales National County cricketers
Glamorgan cricketers